The Orbiter is a fairground ride, which involves a number of cars spun by a rotating axis. The ride was first presented to the public in the summer of 1976, at Margate Dreamland's Amusement Park.

The ride was invented by Former Showman Richard Woolls in 1976, and was manufactured by Tivoli Manufacturing.

History
The idea of the Orbiter was instigated by Richard Woolls and his Brother-in-law, Bob Nichols, as Woolls was experienced in Industrial Engineering. Showman Henry Frederick Smith invested in the blueprints and consequently became the first owner, taking delivery in 1976 of the OB-1. The ride made its debut at Dreamland Amusement Park in Margate, Kent. The Orbiter is made by Tivoli Manufacturing, a British company, and by their U.S representatives, Amtech.

Description
The Orbiter has a number of articulated arms radiating from a central rotating vertical axis. Each arm supports a cluster of cars, which are lifted through 90° into the horizontal position once the ride is spinning. At the same time, each cluster of cars rotates around its arm's axis.

The Orbiter's arms do not always tilt at the same height (90%). Some might tilt all the way, while others tilt little. Most Orbiters consist of six arms, and have three cars for each arm with up to two people sitting in each car. There is a metal lap bar that comes down on the car for the restraint.

References

External links

 National Fairground Archive history of the Orbiter 
 Remix Accident

Amusement rides
Upside-down amusement rides